Cahit Ölmez (born 1 January 1963) is a Dutch actor of Turkish descent.

Filmography
 Gwang tin lung fu wui (1989), Amead
 Krokodillen in Amsterdam (1990), Alex
 Domburg (1996), Metin
 Flikken (1999–2001), Insp. Selattin Ateş
 Najib en Julia (2003, gastrol), Khalid
 Vrijdag de 14e: Erekwestie (2003), Haydar
 Baantjer (2004), Sali Majko
 06/05 (2004), Erdogan Demir
 Allerzielen (2005), verteller (stem)
 Keyzer & De Boer Advocaten (2006), Mr. Yilmaz
 Van Speijk (2006–2007), Det. Altan Uslu
 Funny Dewdrop (2007)
 Wolfseinde (2008–2009), Kadir Gharsallah
 Shylock (2009)
 Gangsterboys (2010), Karan
 Kom niet aan mijn kinderen (2010), Nizar Zalaq
 Kauwboy (2012)

References

External links
 
 

1963 births
Living people
Dutch people of Turkish descent
Dutch male actors
People from Zaanstad